Problems is an Aristotelian or possibly pseudo-Aristotelian collection of problems written in a question and answer format. The collection, gradually assembled by the peripatetic school, reached its final form anywhere between the third century BC and the 6th century AD. The work is divided by topic into 38 sections, and the whole contains almost 900 problems.

Later writers to compose question-and-answer works in imitation of Problems include Plutarch, Alexander of Aphrodisias, and Cassius Iatrosophista. The medieval and Renaissance commentators of Aristotle's Problemata include Pietro d'Abano (whose Expositio of 1310 was reprinted in a number of early editions), Giulio Guastavini and Ludovico Settala.

See also
Corpus Aristotelicum

Notes

External links
 E. S. Forster, translator (1927) Problemata, volume VII Works of Aristotle via Internet Archive

Works by Aristotle